Sixteenth Amendment can refer to:
Sixteenth Amendment to the United States Constitution
Sixteenth Amendment of the Constitution of Ireland
Sixteenth Amendment to the Constitution of Pakistan
Sixteenth Amendment of the Constitution of South Africa